The Czech Republic women's national football team is the women's association football team of the Czech Republic.

Results and fixtures

 The following is a list of match results in the last 12 months, as well as any future matches that have been scheduled.

Legend

2022

2023

Coaching staff

Current coaching staff

Manager history

Dušan Žovinec
Vladimír Hruška
Petr Čermák
Stanislav Krejčík
Karel Rada (2017–)

Players

Current squad
 The following players were called up for the 2023 Cup of Nations squads on 30 January 2023.

Recent call-ups
 The following players have also been called up to a Czech Republic squad within the last 12 months.

 

 
 

Notes:
 = Withdrew due to injury
 = Preliminary squad
 = Training player

Previous squads

Cyprus Women's Cup
2020 Cyprus Women's Cup
2016 Cyprus Women's Cup

SheBelieves Cup
2022 SheBelieves Cup

Cup of Nations
2023 Cup of Nations

Records

 Active players in bold, statistics correct as of 15 February 2023.

Most capped players

Top goalscorers

Competitive record

FIFA Women's World Cup

*Draws include knockout matches decided on penalty kicks.

UEFA Women's Championship

*Draws include knockout matches decided on penalty kicks.

Qualification match record

Other tournaments

See also
Czech Republic women's national football team
Czech Republic women's national football team results
List of Czech Republic women's international footballers
Czech Republic women's national under-19 football team
Czech Republic women's national under-17 football team

References

External links
Official website
FIFA profile

 
European women's national association football teams